Abdurahman Jallow (born 1966) is a Gambian sprinter. He competed in the men's 4 × 100 metres relay at the 1984 Summer Olympics.

References

1966 births
Living people
Athletes (track and field) at the 1984 Summer Olympics
Gambian male sprinters
Olympic athletes of the Gambia
Place of birth missing (living people)